Aamar Aami is 2014 Bengali film written and directed by debutant director Orko Sinha  and produced by Reel and Real Motion Pictures. Dibya Chatterjee made his debut as the executive producer of the film. The film revolves around a story of multiple wishes of our lives in the turbulent times of fast-changing city. It features Indrasish Roy, Rahul Banerjee, Biswanath Basu, Arunima Ghosh and others. The film was released on 5 September 2014

Plot
Subroto (Biswanath Basu) comes from a middle-class background, a poet by heart but he is stuck with a LIC agent job to meet the basic needs and requirements of his family consisting of wife Sumita (Arunima Ghosh) and son Tutul (Ayush Das). He is philosophical yet practical, as he is aware of the fact that in today's world one cannot sustain himself or his family by writing poetry. Sumita is a housewife who once aspired to be an actress, but is now content looking after her husband Subroto and son Tutul. Anirban (Rahul Banerjee) is a successful commercial film maker who makes remakes of south-Indian films but desires to make a film out of his own story and script someday. When Sumita meets her old flame Anirban, their relationship is rekindled and Anirban helps Sumita to realise her suppressed dream of becoming an actress. Soumya (Indrasish Roy) is an aspiring young photographer, but his engineering background and lack of experience prevents him from securing the job of a still photographer in the industry. Soumya lives with his college mate Hindol (Hindol Bhattacharjee) and has a steady girlfriend Chandrima (Jhilik Bhattacharjee). Soumya finally gets a job but he had to make certain compromises to get it. The story follows a series of incidents that affects the lives of Subroto, Sumita, Anirban, Soumya and Chandrima with arising inner conflicts and dilemmas and finally discovering of true desires and inner selves.

Cast
Indrasish Roy as Soumya
Rahul Banerjee as Anirban
Biswanath Basu as Subroto
Arunima Ghosh as Sumita
Upal Sengupta as Magic man
Jhilik Bhattacharya as Chandrima
Hindol Bhattacharjee as Hindol
Bhaskar Banerjee as Chandrima's father
Kamalika Banerjee as Chandrima's mother
Phalguni Chatterjee as Subroto's boss
Ayush Das as Tutul
Debleena Sen as Nikita
Sanjay Biswas 
Rajdeep Gupta as guest appearance in a song (Majhraate Pai Busy)

Soundtrack

The music was composed by director duo Kabir and Shiba and lyrics by Orko Sinha. The music was released on 12 August 2014.

References

Bengali-language Indian films
2010s Bengali-language films
2014 films